The following is a list of awards and nominations received by Canadian actor Christopher Plummer.

Plummer is one of the few actors to have received the Triple Crown of Acting and the only Canadian. He has won the highest competitive honours for film, television and the theatre, also known as the Academy Award, Emmy Award, and Tony Award. 

Plummer has received three Academy Award nominations winning the Academy Award for Best Supporting Actor at the age of 82 for the Mike Mills film Beginners (2010), becoming the oldest person to win an acting award (a distinction he held until being supplanted by 83-year-old Anthony Hopkins in 2021), and he received a nomination at the age of 88 for the Ridley Scott film All the Money in the World, making him the oldest person to be nominated in an acting category. He has also won seven Tony Award nominations winning twice for Best Actor in a Musical for Cyrano in 1974 and Best Actor in a Play for Barrymore in 1997. For his work on television he has also received seven Primetime Emmy Award nominations winning twice for Outstanding Lead Actor in a Miniseries or Movie for Arthur Hailey's the Moneychangers (1977) and Outstanding Voice-Over Performance for Madeline in 1994. He has also received a Grammy Award for Best Children's Album nomination.

Other awards Plummer has received include a British Academy Film Award, a Golden Globe Award, a Screen Actors Guild Award, and a Independent Spirit Award all for his performance Hal Fields, an elderly man who comes out as gay later in life in Mike Mills' independent drama Beginners (2011).

Plummer was just a Grammy Award away from achieving the EGOT status (Emmy, Grammy, Oscar, and Tony), which is considered the "grand slam" of American show business.

Major associations

Academy Awards

Grammy Award

Primetime Emmy Awards

Tony Awards

Industry awards

British Academy Film Awards

Genie Awards

Golden Globe Awards

Independent Spirit Awards

Screen Actors Guild Awards

Critics awards

Miscellaneous awards

Theatre awards

Drama Desk Award

Honorary awards

Notes

See also
 Christopher Plummer filmography

References

Lists of awards received by Canadian actor